Michael Lorkowski (born 26 February 1955 in Hamburg) is a German football manager and former player.

His greatest achievement was winning the 1991–92 DFB-Pokal with Hannover 96, while the team was still in the 2. Bundesliga. In an unlikely triumph, they defeated Borussia Mönchengladbach on penalties on 23 May 1992 to become the first - and thus far, only - non-Bundesliga side to lift the trophy.

He also achieved three promotions to the 2. Bundesliga with FC St. Pauli (1984 and 1986) and VfB Lübeck (1995).

In recent years, he has devoted himself more to other pursuits. He has worked as a sports teacher at diploma level and also explored his love of sailing by captaining voyages off the coast of Schleswig-Holstein.

References

External links 
 

1955 births
Living people
Footballers from Hamburg
German footballers
Association football midfielders
German football managers
FC St. Pauli managers
Hannover 96 managers
Eintracht Braunschweig managers
Wuppertaler SV managers
2. Bundesliga managers
VfL Osnabrück managers
VfB Lübeck managers
Holstein Kiel managers
West German footballers
West German football managers